Porto Nacional is a Brazilian municipality in the state of Tocantins.

Location
It is located approximately in the center of the state at a distance of 60 km. from the state capital of Palmas, which lies to the north on highway TO-050  Porto Nacional lies on the right bank of the important Tocantins River, which flows north to join the Araguaia River.  Leaving from the capital of Goiás, Goiânia, it is located at a distance of 769 km, taking the BR-153 (Belém-Brasília) and then TO-255.

The city is served by Porto Nacional Airport.

The economy
The main economic activities are cattle raising and the growing of crops like soybeans, pineapple, rice, mamona, corn, and sorghum.  
Cattle herd: 84,291

Planted area of main crops in 2006
Pineapple: 70 ha. 
Soybeans: 13,000 ha. 
Rice: 2,000 ha. 
Mamona: 680 ha. 
Corn: 2,083 ha. 
Sorghum: 8,000 ha. 
Plantations of coconut, mango, and citrus fruits.

Farm data for 2006
Total number of farms: 1,278
Agricultural area: 129,098 ha. 
Planted area: 10,300 ha. 
Area of natural pasture: 70,101
Persons working in agriculture: 3,300 (most were relatives of the owner of the farm)

Health and education
Number of health establishments (2005): 29
Private health establishments: 10
Hospitals: 1 with 81 beds
Infant mortality rate: 
Number of schools: 59 primary schools and 10 middle schools.  There were two institutes of higher learning with 688 students in 2006.  
Literacy rate: 79% (over 25 years old)
Ranking on the Municipal Human Development Index: 0.750

References

External links
 City Hall of Porto Nacional website
 Government of the State of Tocantins website

Municipalities in Tocantins